The M-66 is a 160 mm mortar manufactured by Soltam of Israel. The weapon was based on an earlier 160 mm design, the M-58 mortar by Vammas of Finland. It can fire a 38 kg (84 lb) HE bomb out to a maximum range of 9,600 m and requires a crew of 6-8 to operate. 

In addition to the towed variant, the M-66 was  mounted on a Sherman tank chassis, modified with an open-topped compartment with folding front plate, resulting in the Makmat 160 mm which was adopted in 1968.

Operators

Current operators
: Ecuadorian Army
: Honduran Army
: Indian Army
: Israel Defense Forces (primary user)

Former operators
Lebanese Forces
South Lebanon Army
Singapore Army

See also
Makmat 160 mm - self-propelled artillery produced by mounting Soltam M-66 160 mm mortar on M4 Sherman tank chassis.
Soltam M-65
Weapons of the Lebanese Civil War

References

External links

Sherman in israeli service
Israeli-weapons.com
Singapore Artillery Pieces
Weapons of the Arab-Israeli Wars

Mortars of Israel
160 mm mortars
Military equipment introduced in the 1960s